Klin (lit. a wedge) is a town and the administrative center of Klinsky District in Moscow Oblast, Russia, located  northwest of Moscow. Population:    94,000 (1985 est.).

History
It has been known since 1317. In 1482, it was incorporated into the Grand Duchy of Moscow with the rest of the Principality of Tver. Town status was granted in 1781.

Klin was taken by the Germans briefly during the Battle of Moscow in 1941. The German occupation lasted from November 23 to December 15, 1941. A short time later, on December 19, the British Foreign Secretary Anthony Eden and the Soviet ambassador to Great Britain Ivan Maysky visited the town with more than twenty correspondents during Eden's first diplomatic mission to Moscow.

Administrative and municipal status
Within the framework of administrative divisions, Klin serves as the administrative center of Klinsky District. As an administrative division, it is, together with sixty-one rural localities, incorporated within Klinsky District as the Town of Klin. As a municipal division, the Town of Klin is incorporated within Klinsky Municipal District as Klin Urban Settlement.

Architecture and culture

The town is best known as the residence of Pyotr Ilyich Tchaikovsky, whose house, the Tchaikovsky House-Museum, is open to visitors as a museum. It was here that the composer wrote his last major work, the 6th symphony, or the "Pathetique".

Among several churches, the most noteworthy are the 16th-century church of the Dormition cloister and the baroque Resurrection cathedral (1712).

Economy
There is a large beer factory, which produces Klinskoye beer.

Transportation
The M10 highway connecting Moscow to St. Petersburg and the Moscow-Saint Petersburg Railway run through the town.

Geography

Climate

Military
It was home to Klin air base during the Cold War.

Sports
Local association football team Khimik plays in the Moscow Oblast league. Titan Klin play in the VHL, the second level of Russian ice hockey.

Notable people
Sergei Tyablikov, theoretical physicist
Yevgeny Minayev, Soviet Olympic weightlifter
Yevgeny Leonov, film director who grew up in Klin
Vera Mukhina, sculptor; one of the streets in the town is named after her

Twin towns – sister cities

Klin is twinned with:

 Lappeenranta, Finland (1975)
 Orly, France (1980)
 Meishan, China (1998)
 Krychaw, Belarus (2002)
 Byerazino, Belarus (2005)

References

Notes

Sources

External links
Unofficial website of Klin 
Nutcrackers and Christmas Trees in historic Klin

Cities and towns in Moscow Oblast
Klinsky Uyezd